The following is a list of the monastic houses in Somerset, England.

See also
 List of monastic houses in England

Notes

References

Medieval sites in England
Religion in Somerset
Somerset
Somerset
Lists of buildings and structures in Somerset